The Barwon South West is an economic rural region located in the southwestern part of Victoria, Australia. The Barwon South West region stretches from the tip of the Queenscliff Heads to the border of South Australia. It is home to Victoria’s largest provincial centre, Geelong and the major centres of
Aireys Inlet, Apollo Bay,  and Warrnambool. It draws its name from the Barwon River and the geographic location of the region in the state of Victoria.

The Barwon South West region is located along the two major interstate transport corridors – the Princes Highway corridor and the Western Highway corridor. The region comprises two distinct and inter-connected sub-regions or districts: Greater Geelong and the Great South Coast. The region is bounded by Bass Strait and the Great Australian Bight in the south and southwest, the South Australian border in the west, the Grampians region in the north and the Greater Melbourne region in the east.

Administration

Political representation 
For the purposes of Australian federal elections for the House of Representatives, the Barwon South West region is contained within all or part of the electoral divisions of Corangamite, Corio, and Wannon.

For the purposes of Victorian elections for the Legislative Assembly, the Barwon South West region is contained within all or part of the electoral districts of Bellarine, Geelong, Lara, Lowan, Polwarth, Ripon, South Barwon, and South-West Coast.

Local government areas 
The region contains nine local government areas and one unincorporated area of Victoria, which are:

Environmental protection 
The Barwon South West region contains the Brisbane Ranges, Cobboboonee, Great Otway, Lower Glenelg and Port Campbell national parks.

See also

 Geography of Victoria
 Regions of Victoria

Notes

References

External links